Kelly Thomas (born September 9, 1960) is a former American football tackle. He played for the Tampa Bay Buccaneers from 1983 to 1984 and for the Los Angeles Rams in 1987.

References

1960 births
Living people
American football offensive tackles
USC Trojans football players
Tampa Bay Buccaneers players
Los Angeles Rams players